Greenidea formosana, also known as Greenidea (Trichosiphum) formosana, is an aphid in the superfamily Aphidoidea in the order Hemiptera. It is a true bug and sucks sap from plants.

References 

 http://animaldiversity.org/accounts/Greenidea_formosana/classification/
 http://www.nbair.res.in/Aphids/Greenidea-formosana.php
 http://www.fcla.edu/FlaEnt/fe87p159.pdf 
 http://aphid.speciesfile.org/Common/basic/Taxa.aspx?TaxonNameID=1162293

Greenideinae
Agricultural pest insects